John Huston Ricard, S.S.J. (born February 29, 1940) is an American prelate of the Catholic Church. He served as bishop of the Diocese of Pensacola-Tallahassee in Florida from 1997 to 2011 and as an auxiliary bishop of the Archdiocese of Baltimore in Maryland from 1984 to 1997.

Ricard was elected as superior general of the Society of St. Joseph of the Sacred Heart in August 2019.

Biography

Early life and education
Born on February 29, 1940, in New Roads, Louisiana, John Ricard is of Creole descent. After graduating from Xavier University Preparatory School in New Orleans in 1958, he joined the Society of St. Joseph of the Sacred Heart, entering the Mary Immaculate Novitiate in Walden, New York. Ricard then attended Epiphany Apostolic College in Newburgh, New York. He completed his theological studies at St. Joseph's Seminary in Washington, D.C.

Priestly ministry
On May 25, 1968. Ricard was ordained to the priesthood by Bishop Robert Tracy for the Society of St. Joseph of the Sacred Heart. Ricard's first assignment was as associate pastor at St. Peter Claver Parish in New Orleans. In 1970, he earned a masters degree from Tulane University.

In 1972, Ricard was assigned as pastor of Holy Redeemer Parish, then in 1975 at Holy Comforter-St. Cyprian Parish, both in Washington, D.C. He also served as an instructor at the National Catholic School of Social Service at the Catholic University of America in Washington from 1976 to 1978. In 1979, Richard was appointed pastor of Our Lady of Perpetual Help Parish in Washington. He was awarded a doctorate from Catholic University in 1983.

Auxiliary Bishop of Baltimore
On May 25, 1984, Pope John Paul II appointed Ricard as an auxiliary bishop of the Archdiocese of Baltimore and titular bishop of Rucuma. He was consecrated on July 2, 1984, at the Cathedral of Mary Our Queen in Baltimore by Archbishop William Borders.

Bishop of Pensacola-Tallahassee 
On January 20, 1997, John Paul II appointed Ricard as bishop of the Diocese of Pensacola-Tallahassee. He was installed on March 13, 1997. On May 14, 2004, Ricard issued a statement denouncing the "abuse and torture" by US military forces of Iraqi combatants captured during the Iraqi insurgency. 

During his episcopal tenures, Ricard served as chair of Catholic Relief Services from 1995 to 2002, member of Pontifical Council Cor Unum, and chair of the USCCB's Committee on Social Development and World Peace, Domestic Social Development from 1992 to 1995. He was also a member of the USCCB's Secretariat of Black Catholics.

On December 22, 2009, Ricard suffered a stroke and was treated at Sacred Heart Hospital of Pensacola.

Retirement 
Ricard tendered his letter of resignation as bishop of the Diocese of Pensacola-Tallahassee to Pope Benedict XVI in February 2011, citing poor health. The pope accepted Ricard's resignation on March 11, 2011. 

In June 2011, Ricard was appointed rector of St. Joseph's Seminary. In June 2019, Ricard was elected as superior general of the Josephites.On November 24, 2021, Ricard issued a statement with Archbishop Wilton Gregory calling for justice following the 2020 murder of Ahmaud Arbery by three men in a suburb of Brunswick, Georgia.

See also
 

 Catholic Church hierarchy
 Catholic Church in the United States
 Historical list of the Catholic bishops of the United States
 List of Catholic bishops of the United States
 Lists of patriarchs, archbishops, and bishops

References

External links 
 Roman Catholic Diocese of Pensacola–Tallahassee Official Site
 National Black Catholic Congress bio of John Ricard
 National Black Catholic Clergy Caucus bio of John Ricard

Episcopal succession

Roman Catholic bishops of Pensacola–Tallahassee
Living people
1940 births
Roman Catholic Archdiocese of Baltimore
National Catholic School of Social Service faculty
African-American Roman Catholic bishops
Tulane University alumni
Roman Catholic bishops in Louisiana
20th-century Roman Catholic bishops in the United States
21st-century Roman Catholic bishops in the United States
Louisiana Creole people
Catholic University of America alumni
Josephite bishops
Superiors General of the Society of St. Joseph of the Sacred Heart
21st-century African-American people
20th-century African-American people
People from New Roads, Louisiana
African-American Catholic consecrated religious
African-American Catholic superiors general
Epiphany Apostolic College
St. Joseph's Seminary (Washington, DC)